Martin Creek is a stream in the U.S. state of North Carolina. It is a tributary to the Hiwassee River.

Martin Creek was named after the pioneer Martin family, which settled near its banks in the 1830s.

Course
Martin Creek rises on the east side of Mary King Mountain in Cherokee County, North Carolina and then follows a northerly course to join the Hiawassee River about 0.5 miles east of Murphy, North Carolina.

Watershed
Martin Creek drains  of area, receives about 58.9 in/year of precipitation, and has a wetness index of 281.47 and is about 77% forested.

References

Rivers of North Carolina
Rivers of Cherokee County, North Carolina